Wasdale, Eskdale and Duddon is an area of protected countryside, now held as National Trust property: it is part of the Lake District, located in south-western Cumbria, England.

Wasdale

In Wasdale, the National Trust owns both the country's highest mountain, Scafell Pike, as well as its deepest lake, Wastwater. The majority of the surrounding mountains also belong to the Trust, including Great Gable. Further down the valley is the wooded and tranquil Nether Wasdale Estate.

Eskdale

In nearby Eskdale, the National Trust owns over 70 square kilometres (27 mile²) and eleven farms are protected with extensive areas of fell and Hardknott Roman Fort, which is maintained by English Heritage.

Duddon

In the Duddon Valley the Trust oversees almost 30 square kilometres (12 mile²) and nine farms.

External links
 Wasdale information at the National Trust
 Eskdale and Duddon information at the National Trust

National Trust properties in the Lake District